Galva may refer to:

Places
United States
 Galva, Illinois
 Galva, Iowa
 Galva, Kansas